Cuvieria may refer to:
 Cuvieria (hydrozoan), a genus of hydrozoans in the family Dipleurosomatidae
 Cuvieria, a synonym for Psolus, a genus of sea cucumbers
 Cuvieria, a synonym for Cuvierina, a genus of gastropods in the family Cuvierinidae